Maclura brasiliensis is a species of plant in the family Moraceae. It is found in Brazil, Honduras, Nicaragua, Peru, and Venezuela.

References

braziliensis
Least concern plants
Plants described in 1841
Trees of Brazil
Trees of Peru
Taxonomy articles created by Polbot